"Martha's Harbour" is a song by English rock band All About Eve. The acoustic ballad reached  10 on the UK Singles Chart and helped the group's self-titled debut album reach No. 7 on the UK Albums Chart. The song features only Julianne Regan's voice, acoustic guitars played by Tim Bricheno, and sound effects of ocean waves.

Background
On its creation, Julianne Regan has said, in an interview on BBC radio, "This song happened by accident when we were recording the first album. It was one of those things when we had the day off and we were sat in this very idyllic setting beneath a willow tree besides a stream by this beautiful residential recording studio and it just came out so naturally. It was a miracle of a little song and it's very dear to us because of that, because it was very pure, a really happy accident. Everybody went to the pub and we put it down and by the time they got back Martha's Harbour was committed to tape. Martha's Harbour is a fictitious backdrop for this happening."
Although Andy Cousin is credited as a co-writer, he does not perform on the recording nor was he involved in the writing.

Top of the Pops performance
The song is well known for an incident on the popular BBC UK music show Top of the Pops, when the group, ready to do a mimed (as was BBC policy at the time) performance of their hit, were not played the backing track through their monitors, so they sat motionless while the television and studio audience could hear the song. Due to this error on the part of the BBC, the band were invited back the following week and insisted on playing the song live.

Track listings

7-inch single
A. "Martha's Harbour"
B. "Another Door"

UK 12-inch single
A1. "Martha's Harbour"
A2. "Another Door"
B1. "In the Meadow" (live)

UK and European CD single
 "Martha's Harbour" – 3:10
 "Another Door" – 3:26
 "Wild Flowers" – 3:51
 "She Moves Through the Fair" – 5:21

UK cassette single
 "Martha's Harbour"
 "Another Door"
 "Never Promise (Anyone Forever)" (live)
 "In the Meadow" (live)

European 5-inch CD Video single
 "Martha's Harbour" – 3:07
 "Like Emily" – 5:16
 "Another Door" – 3:26
 "She Moves Through the Fair" – 5:05
 "Martha's Harbour" (video) – 3:23

Credits and personnel
Credits are lifted from the UK 7-inch single sleeve.
 Julianne Regan – writing, vocals
 Tim Bricheno – writing, acoustic guitar
 Andy Cousin – writing
 Paul Samwell-Smith – production
 Tony Phillips – engineering
 Stylorouge – artwork design
 Simon Fowler – photography
 Tony Perrin – management

Charts

References

1980s ballads
1988 singles
1988 songs
All About Eve (band) songs
Mercury Records singles
Phonogram Records singles
Song recordings produced by Paul Samwell-Smith